The Dittmar HD 153 Motor-Möwe was a West German light aircraft that was first flown in November 1953.

Design and development
The HD 153 prototype was a two-seat side-by-side high wing monoplane powered by a  Continental A65 engine and was of wooden construction with detachable wing and tail assemblies to facilitate road transportation when needed. A second prototype aircraft was fitted with a  Hirth engine.

Operational history
The aircraft was designed for private and club use and served as a trainer and glider tug. Heini Dittmar, the aircraft’s designer, was killed in 1960 when his Motor-Möwe crashed near Essen/Mulheim airport. Small numbers of the type were completed by the end of 1960 and on 1 January 1961 four HD 153 and four HD 156 Motor–Möwen appeared in the West German civil aircraft register. I 1965 four HD 153 and five HD 156 Motor-Möwen were registered in West Germany. By 2007, no examples were known to be active.

Variants

 HD 153  two-seat aircraft
HD 153A-1production two-seaters
 HD 156  three-seat aircraft fitted with additional side windows

Specifications (HD 153 with C90 engine)

References

External links

 28-APR-1960 Heini Dittmars fatal test flight
 11-APR-1959 wing separated during descent after glider towing

1950s German civil utility aircraft
High-wing aircraft
Single-engined tractor aircraft
Aircraft first flown in 1953